is a 2016 Japanese crime comedy film directed by . It was released in Japan by Toho on August 27, 2016.

Plot

Cast
Shinobu Otake
Etsushi Toyokawa
Machiko Ono
Kyōko Hasegawa
Asami Mizukawa
Shunsuke Kazama
Kimiko Yo
Mimura
Satoru Matsuo

Asuka Hinoi
Zen Kajihara

Masatō Ibu
Shigeru Izumiya
Akira Emoto
Shōfukutei Tsurube II
Masahiko Tsugawa
Masatoshi Nagase

Reception
The film was 4th placed at the Japanese box office on its opening weekend, with 182,555 admissions, and grossed .

References

External links
 

Japanese crime comedy films
2010s crime comedy films
Toho films
2016 comedy films
2010s Japanese films